Cuba competed at the 2015 World Aquatics Championships in Kazan, Russia from 24 July to 9 August 2015.

Diving

Cuban divers qualified for the individual spots and synchronized teams at the World Championships.

Men

Women

Swimming

Cuban swimmers have achieved qualifying standards in the following events (up to a maximum of 2 swimmers in each event at the A-standard entry time, and 1 at the B-standard):

Men

Women

Synchronized swimming

Cuba has qualified two synchronized swimmers to compete in each of the following events.

References

External links
Kazan 2015 Official Site

Nations at the 2015 World Aquatics Championships
2015
World Aquatics Championships